Cecilia Choi Sze-wan (born 23 July 1994) is a Hong Kong actress. She is known for playing the key supporting role in Detention and the leading role in   Beyond the Dream, for which she won for the Best Actress award at the 26th Hong Kong Film Critics Society Awards and was nominated for Best Actress at  39th Hong Kong Film Awards.

Filmography

Film

Television series

Music Video

Awards and nominations

References

External links

1994 births
Living people
21st-century Hong Kong actresses
Hong Kong film actresses
Hong Kong television actresses
Taipei National University of the Arts alumni